Whitby Abbey was a 7th-century Christian monastery that later became a Benedictine abbey. The abbey church was situated overlooking the North Sea on the East Cliff above Whitby in North Yorkshire, England, a centre of the medieval Northumbrian kingdom. The abbey and its possessions were confiscated by the crown under Henry VIII during the Dissolution of the Monasteries between 1536 and 1545.

Since that time, the ruins of the abbey have continued to be used by sailors as a landmark at the headland. Since the 20th century, the substantial ruins of the church have been declared a Grade I Listed building and are in the care of English Heritage; the site museum is housed in Cholmley House.

Streoneshalh
The first monastery was founded in 657 AD by the Anglo-Saxon era King of Northumbria, Oswy (Oswiu) as Streoneshalh (the older name for Whitby). He appointed Lady Hilda, abbess of Hartlepool Abbey and grand-niece of Edwin, the first Christian king of Northumbria, as founding abbess. The name Streoneshalh is thought to signify Fort Bay or Tower Bay, in reference to a supposed Roman settlement that previously existed on the site. This contention has never been proven and alternative theories have been proposed, such as the name meaning Streona's settlement. Some believe that the name referred to Eadric Streona, but Streona died in 1017 so the naming of Streoneshalh would have preceded his birth by several hundred years.

The double monastery of Celtic monks and nuns was home (614–680) to the great Northumbrian poet Cædmon.

In 664 the Synod of Whitby took place at the monastery to resolve the question of whether the Northumbrian church would adopt and follow Celtic Christian traditions or adopt Roman practice, including the manner of calculating the date of Easter and form of the monastic tonsure. The decision, with the support of King Oswy, was for adopting Roman practices and the date of Easter was set. 

Streoneshalch monastery was laid waste by Danes in successive raids between 867 and 870 under Ingwar and Ubba and remained desolate for more than 200 years. A locality named 'Prestebi' was recorded in the Domesday Survey, which may be a sign that religious life was revived in some form after the Danish raids. In Old Norse, this name means a habitation of priests. The old monastery given to Reinfrid comprised about 40 ruined monasteria vel oratoria, similar to Irish monastic ruins with numerous chapels and cells.

Whitby
Reinfrid, a soldier of William the Conqueror, became a monk and traveled to Streoneshalh, which was then known as Prestebi or Hwitebi (the "white settlement" in Old Norse). He approached William de Percy for a grant of land, who gave him the ruined monastery of St. Peter with two carucates of land, to found a new monastery. Serlo de Percy, the founder's brother, joined Reinfrid at the new monastery, which followed the Benedictine rule. The greater part of de Percy's building was pulled down and the monastery was rebuilt on a larger scale in the 1220s.

The Benedictine abbey thrived for centuries as a centre of learning. This second monastery was destroyed by Henry VIII in 1540 during the Dissolution of the Monasteries. The abbey was bought by Sir Richard Cholmley. It remained in the Cholmley family and their descendants, the Strickland family. The Strickland family passed it to the UK government in 1920. The ruins are now owned and maintained by English Heritage.

In December 1914, Whitby Abbey was shelled by the German battlecruisers Von der Tann and Derfflinger, whose crew "were aiming for the Coastguard Station on the end of the headland." Scarborough and Hartlepool were also attacked. The abbey buildings sustained considerable damage during the ten-minute attack.

Abbey possessions
The original gift of William de Percy included not only the monastery of St. Peter at Streoneshalch, but the town and port of Whitby, with its parish church of St Mary and six dependent chapels at Fyling, Hawsker, Sneaton, Ugglebarnby, Dunsley, and Aislaby; five mills including Ruswarp; the village of Hackness with two mills and the parish church of St. Mary; and the church of St Peter at Hackness, "where our monks served God, died, and were buried," and various other gifts enumerated in the Memorial in the abbot's book.

Priors and abbots
The first prior of the reestablished monastery, Reinfrid, ruled for many years before being killed in an accident. He was buried at St Peter's at Hackness, now in North Yorkshire. He was succeeded as prior by Serlo de Percy.

Dracula
Bram Stoker's 1897 novel Dracula featured Count Dracula as a creature resembling a large dog which came ashore at the headland and runs up the 199 steps to the graveyard of St Mary's Church in the shadow of the Whitby Abbey ruins. The abbey is also described in Mina Harker’s diary in the novel:

Gallery

Notable burials
 Hilda of Whitby
 Bosa of York
 Edwin of Deira, King of Deira and Bernicia, and a Saint
 Oswiu of Northumbria, a King of Bernicia
 Eahlfrith, widow of King Oswiu and Abbess of Whitby 
 Ælfflæd of Whitby, daughter of Oswiu and Eanflæd, also an Abbess of Whitby
 Joscelin of Louvain
 Sir William de Percy, 1st Baron Percy (died c. 1096), Norman baron and Crusader
 Sir Richard de Percy, 5th Baron Percy (1166–1243), signatory to Magna Carta

Footnotes

References
English Heritage official site
Whitby History

External links

Whitby
7th-century establishments in England
Anglo-Saxon monastic houses
860s disestablishments
1540 disestablishments in England
Benedictine monasteries in England
Christian monasteries established in the 7th century
Christian monasteries established in the 11th century
Churches in North Yorkshire
Double monasteries
Dracula in written fiction
English Heritage sites in North Yorkshire
Grade I listed churches in North Yorkshire
History of North Yorkshire
Monasteries in North Yorkshire
Ruined abbeys and monasteries
Ruins in North Yorkshire
Grade I listed monasteries
Grade I listed ruins
Burial sites of the House of Kent
Burial sites of the Royal House of Northumbria
Monasteries dissolved under the English Reformation
Churches completed in 657
7th-century church buildings in England